John Baraza (born 3 June 1974) is a Kenyan former footballer who played as a striker. He represented Kenya at the 2004 Africa Cup of Nations.

References

1974 births
Living people
Kenyan footballers
Kenya international footballers
Association football forwards
Oserian F.C. players
Tusker F.C. players
IF Sylvia players
Chemelil Sugar F.C. players
Young Africans S.C. players
Rayon Sports F.C. players
Sofapaka F.C. players
2004 African Cup of Nations players
People from Nakuru County
Tanzanian Premier League players